Aditya Hari Sasongko (born 4 July 1988) is an Indonesian former professional tennis player.

A left-handed player from Bantul, Yogyakarta, Sasongko competed on the professional tour at ITF Futures.

Sasongko appeared in 12 Davis Cup rubbers for Indonesia between 2008 and 2017 across 11 ties, registering four singles wins. He also featured in multiple editions of the Southeast Asian Games, including in 2011 when he won a gold medal in the team event. In 2014 he represented Indonesia at the Asian Games in Incheon.

See also
List of Indonesia Davis Cup team representatives

References

External links
 
 
 

1988 births
Living people
Indonesian male tennis players
People from Bantul Regency
Tennis players at the 2014 Asian Games
Asian Games competitors for Indonesia
Southeast Asian Games medalists in tennis
Southeast Asian Games gold medalists for Indonesia
Southeast Asian Games silver medalists for Indonesia
Southeast Asian Games bronze medalists for Indonesia
Competitors at the 2011 Southeast Asian Games
Competitors at the 2015 Southeast Asian Games
Competitors at the 2017 Southeast Asian Games
Competitors at the 2011 Summer Universiade